Vladislaus II, also known as Vladislav, Władysław or Wladislas (1 March 1456 – 13 March 1516), was King of Bohemia from 1471 to 1516, and King of Hungary and Croatia from 1490 to 1516. As the eldest son of Casimir IV Jagiellon, he was expected to inherit Poland and Lithuania. George of Poděbrady, the Hussite ruler of Bohemia, offered to make Vladislaus his heir in 1468. George needed Casimir IV's support against the rebellious Catholic noblemen and their ally, Matthias Corvinus, King of Hungary. The Diet of Bohemia elected Vladislaus king after George's death, but he could only rule Bohemia proper, because Matthias (whom the Catholic nobles had elected king) occupied Moravia, Silesia and both Lusatias. Vladislaus tried to reconquer the four provinces with his father's assistance, but Matthias repelled them.

Vladislaus and Matthias divided the Crown of Bohemia in the Peace of Olomouc in 1479. The estates of the realm had strengthened their position during the war between the two kings. Vladislaus's attempts to promote the Catholics caused a rebellion in Prague and other towns in 1483, forcing him to acknowledge the dominance of the Hussites in the municipal assemblies. The Diet confirmed the right of the Bohemian noblemen and commoners to freely adhere either to Hussitism or Catholicism in 1485. After Matthias Corvinus seized Silesian duchies to grant them to his illegitimate son, John Corvinus, Vladislaus made new alliances against him in the late 1480s.

Vladislaus (whose mother, Elizabeth of Habsburg, was the sister of Matthias's predecessor) laid claim to Hungary after Matthias's death. The Diet of Hungary elected him king after his supporters defeated John Corvinus. The other two claimants, Maximilian of Habsburg and Vladislaus's brother, John Albert, invaded Hungary, but they could not assert their claim and made peace with Vladislaus in 1491. He settled in Buda, enabling the Estates of Bohemia, Moravia, Silesia and both Lusatias to take full charge of state administration. Like previously in Bohemia, also in Hungary Vladislaus always approved the decisions of the Royal Council, hence his Hungarian nickname "Dobzse László" (in Czech král Dobře, in Latin rex Bene – "King Very Well", from Polish dobrze). Due to the concessions he had made before his election, the royal treasury could not finance a standing army and Matthias Corvinus's Black Army was dissolved after a rebellion, although the Ottomans made regular raids against the southern border and after 1493 even annexed territories in Croatia.

Early life

Vladislaus was the eldest son of Casimir IV, King of Poland and Grand Duke of Lithuania, and Elizabeth of Habsburg. She was the daughter of Albert, King of the Romans, Hungary and Bohemia, and Elizabeth of Luxembourg, the only child and sole heiress of the Holy Roman Emperor Sigismund. Vladislaus was born in Kraków on 1 March 1456. His mother and father laid claim to Hungary and Bohemia after her childless brother, Ladislaus the Posthumous, died on 23 November 1457. However, their claims were ignored in both Hungary and Bohemia. The Diet of Hungary elected Matthias Corvinus king on 24 January 1458. The Bohemian Estates of the realm proclaimed the Hussite George of Poděbrady king on 2 March.

Vladislaus was his father's heir in Poland and Lithuania. Casimir IV wanted to prepare all his sons for ruling a realm and tasked renowned scholars with their education. The historian Jan Długosz was Vladislaus's tutor.

Pope Paul II excommunicated George of Poděbrady in late 1466 and proclaimed a crusade against him. The Czech Catholic noblemen rose up against the "heretic" George of Poděbrady and sought assistance from Matthias Corvinus. Matthias declared war in March 1468 and invaded Moravia. On 16 May 1468, George of Poděbrady offered Casimir IV to make Vladislaus his heir if Casimir mediated a peace treaty between Bohemia and Hungary. Matthias refused Casimir's offer, but George of Poděbrady forced him to sign a truce in early 1469. Fearing of losing Matthias's support, the Catholic nobles proclaimed him king of Bohemia in Olomouc on 3 May. After George of Poděbrady repeated his offer of bequeathing Bohemia to Vladislaus, Casimir IV entered into negotiations with the Holy Roman Emperor, Frederick III on George of Poděbrady's behalf. George of Poděbrady died on 22 March 1471.

Reign

War for Bohemia

After the fifteen-year-old Vladislaus pledged to respect the liberties of the Estates of the realm, the Bohemian Diet elected him king at Kutná Hora on 27 May 1471. He was specifically required to acknowledge the existence of two "nations" (the Catholic and Hussite Estates) in his realm in accordance with the Compacts of Basel, although the Holy See had already condemned the Compacts in 1462. The Holy See regarded Vladislaus's election invalid and the papal legate, Lorenzo Roverella, confirmed Matthias Corvinus's claim to Bohemia on 28 May. However, Emperor Frederick III refused to acknowledge Matthias as the lawful king of Bohemia.

Vladislaus was crowned king in Prague on 22 August 1471. He could only secure his position with the noblemen's support, because no army had accompanied him to Bohemia. Consequently, the Diet developed into the most influential body of state administration during his reign. The Diet started to work as a legislative assembly and passed decrees that were recorded in specific registers.

Casimir IV also supported Vladislaus. He allowed his second son, Vladislaus's brother Casimir, to invade Upper Hungary (now Slovakia) from Poland after a group of Hungarian barons and prelates offered Casimir the Hungarian throne in late 1471. Matthias defeated Casimir and forced him to withdraw from Hungary before the end of the year. On 1 March 1472, Pope Sixtus IV authorized his legate, Marco Barbo, to excommunicate Vladislaus and his father if they continued to wage war against Matthias. The first truce between Vladislaus and Matthias was signed on 31 May. Their representatives continued negotiations for months, often in the presence of the papal legate who supported Matthias's claims. The Diet elected four noblemen at Benešov in 1473 to administer Bohemia as regents until peace was restored.

The representatives of Casimir IV and Matthias concluded a peace treaty on 21 February 1474. Two days later Vladislaus also agreed to sign a truce for three years. Before long, Vladislaus met Frederick III at the Imperial Diet in Nuremberg and persuaded him to make an alliance against Matthias. Casimir IV also joined the coalition. The Polish and Bohemian armies broke into Silesia and besieged Matthias in Wrocław in October. The Hungarian troops cut off the invaders' supply routes, forcing Vladislaus and Casimir to sign a new truce for more than one year on 8 December.

The young Barbara of Brandenburg inherited the Duchy of Głogów in Silesia from her husband, Henry XI of Głogów, in 1476. Most Silesian dukes had years before acknowledged the suzerainty of Matthias Corvinus, but Vladislaus wanted to expand his authority in the province. He married Barbara by proxy to seize her duchy. With Matthias's support, Henry XI's nephew, Jan II, Duke of Żagań, broke into the duchy and occupied it. After Barbara lost her dowry, the Royal Council forbade her to come to Bohemia.

Vladislaus's attempt to seize Głogów gave rise to a new conflict. Vladislaus and Frederick III confirmed their alliance against Matthias on 5 December 1476. The papal legate, Baldasare de Piscia, threatened Vladislaus with excommunication if he invaded Matthias's realms. Frederick III installed Vladislaus as king of Bohemia and Prince-elector of the Holy Roman Empire on 10 June 1477. Two days later, Matthias declared war against the emperor and invaded Austria. Vladislaus sent reinforcements to his ally, but he withdrew his troops from Austria before the end of July. Frederick was forced to acknowledge Matthias as the lawful king of Bohemia on 1 December.

Baldasare de Piscia excommunicated Vladislaus and his supporters on 15 January 1478. The representatives of Vladislaus and Matthias started new negotiations, and they reached a compromise that was accepted by both monarchs. The right of both Vladislaus and Matthias to use the title of king of Bohemia was confirmed, but only Matthias was required to address Vladislaus as such in their correspondence. The Lands of the Bohemian Crown were divided: Vladislaus ruled in Bohemia proper and Matthias in Moravia, Silesia, Upper and Lower Lusatias. The compromise also authorized Vladislaus to redeem the three provinces for 400,000 gold florins after Matthias's death. Matthias and Vladislaus ratified the peace treaty with great pomp and ceremony at a meeting in Olomouc on 21 July 1479.

Conflicts in Bohemia

The Peace of Olomouc enabled the Catholic noblemen who had supported Matthias to return to Bohemia. Vladislaus, who remained a Catholic, decided to strengthen the position of the Catholics in his realm because he needed the support of the Holy See to strengthen his position in Europe. Although he was unable to achieve the restoration of the Roman Catholic Archdiocese of Prague, he began replacing the Hussite members of the town councils with Catholic burghers. Two sons of Vladislaus's predecessor, Jindřich and Hynek of Poděbrady, also converted to Catholicism.

Vladislaus's campaign for re-Catholization stirred up the Hussites, and the townspeople in Prague rose up in September 1483. The rebels murdered or expelled all Catholic clerics and aldermen and persecuted the Germans and Jews. Vladislaus was also forced to leave the capital. Similar rebellions broke out in Nymburk, Žatec and Hradec Králové. After realizing that he could not send forces against Prague, Vladislaus acknowledged that he was unable to continue his pro-Catholic policy and confirmed the new Hussite aldermen in 1484. Vladislaus had a close relationship with the Jewish community, including employing Jewish people such as Abraham of Bohemia. 

The success of the revolt of the burghers of Prague brought about a between the moderate Hussite and Catholic noblemen who treated the townspeople with disdain. Vladislaus also urged the noblemen to reach an agreement on religious matters. Their compromise was confirmed at the Diet in Kutná Hora in March 1485, with acknowledging the right of both noblemen and commoners to freely adhere either to Catholicism or to Utraquism during the following 31 years.

Frederick III failed to invite Vladislaus and Matthias to the Imperial Diet at Frankfurt, where his son, Maximilian, was elected King of the Romans on 16 February 1486. Frederick's omission offended both kings of Bohemia who made an alliance against the emperor at a meeting in Jihlava on 11 September. The meeting also created an opportunity to discuss other issues of common interest, especially the circulation of money in their realms. Vladislaus pledged to send reinforcements to Matthias to fight against Frederick III, but his advisors convinced him not to keep his promise. The Diet of Bohemia also urged him to make peace with the emperor and the prince-electors in June 1487. In the same year, Pope Innocent VIII lifted the excommunication and recognized Vladislaus as king of Bohemia.

Matthias Corvinus confiscated large estates in his realms and granted them to his illegitimate son, John Corvinus, because he wanted to make John his heir. The sons of George of Poděbrady were among the barons who lost their estates to John Corvinus, which annoyed Vladislaus because some estates were located in the Lands of the Bohemian Crown. Vladislaus sought his father's assistance, and they made a formal alliance against Matthias on 23 April. Matthias forced Jan II of Żagań to renounce Głogów in favor of John Corvinus in spring 1489. Before long, Vladislaus made peace with Emperor Frederick, but the emperor's son, Maximilian, started peace negotiations with Matthias.

War for Hungary

Matthias Corvinus died unexpectedly in Vienna on 6 April 1490. By the time the noblemen assembled to elect his successor in May, four candidates laid claim to the throne. John Corvinus was primarily supported by barons and prelates who owned estates along the southern frontier (including Lawrence Újlaki and Peter Váradi, Archbishop of Kalocsa). Maximilian of Habsburg referred to the 1463 Peace Treaty of Wiener Neustadt, which prescribed that Emperor Frederick or his heirs were to inherit Hungary if Matthias died without a legitimate heir. Vladislaus claimed Hungary as the eldest son of the sister of Matthias's predecessor, Ladislaus the Posthumous. However, his parents, who wanted to secure a separate realm to their each sons, proposed Vladislaus's younger brother, John Albert.

Most Hungarian barons and prelates preferred Vladislaus, because his rule in Bohemia had indicated that he would respect their liberties. Vladislaus also pledged that he would marry Matthias's wealthy widow, Beatrice of Naples, after his coronation. His two supporters, Stephen Báthory and Paul Kinizsi, defeated John Corvinus on 4 July. The Diet of Hungary elected Vladislaus king on 15 July. Vladislaus who had left Prague for Hungary in late June issued a charter promising to refrain from imposing extraordinary taxes or introducing other "harmful novelties" and to closely cooperate with the Royal Council. He reached Buda (the capital of Hungary) on 9 August. He met his brother, who had marched as far as Pest on the opposite side of the Danube River, but they did not reach a compromise.

Vladislaus was crowned king on 18 September in Székesfehérvár. In accordance with the promise he made after his election, he settled in Buda. In his absence, Bohemia was administered by the great officers of state, especially the Burgrave of Prague and the Chancellor. Moravia, Silesia and Lusatia had acknowledged his rule soon after Matthias Corvinus's death. Although Vladislaus pledged that the three provinces would be attached to the Hungarian Crown until the money stipulated in the Peace of Olomouc was paid to the Hungarian treasury, the Estates of the Bohemian Crown argued that the personal union under his rule made that stipulation void. The 400,000 gold florins were never paid.

John Albert did not renounce Hungary after Vladislaus's coronation. He captured Eger and laid siege to Kassa (Košice in Slovakia) in September. Vladislaus married Beatrice of Naples in Esztergom on 4 October, but the marriage was kept secret, although she gave considerable funds to him to finance his campaigns for Hungary. Maximilian of Habsburg also invaded Hungary and seized Szombathely, Veszprém and Székesfehérvár by the end of November. Vladislaus's supporters relieved Kassa in early December, and Maximilian withdrew from Hungary before the end of the year, because he could not finance his campaign. John Albert renounced his claim to Hungary in exchange for the Duchy of Głogów and the suzerainty over half of Silesia on 20 February 1491. John Albert again broke into Hungary in autumn, but Stephen Zápolya forced him to withdraw.

Vladislaus's troops had meanwhile expelled the army of Maximilian of Habsburg from Hungary. In the Peace of Pressburg, signed on 7 November, Vladislaus renounced all territories that Matthias Corvinus had conquered in Austria and also acknowledged the Habsburgs' right to inherit Hungary and Bohemia if he died without a son. Stephen Zápolya routed John Albert at Eperjes (Prešov in Slovakia) on 24 December, forcing him to abandon his claim to Hungary.

New regime in Hungary
Although John Filipec, Bishop of Várad, warned Vladislaus that the Hungarians could only be "forced to obedience with a rod of iron", Vladislaus did not continue Matthias Corvinus's centralizing policies. Almost all important decisions were made collectively in the Royal Council and Vladislaus always accepted them, saying Dobrze ("Very well" in Polish), which is the origin of his nickname. Thomas Bakócz and Stephen Zápolya were his most influential advisors in the 1490s. The Diet of Hungary which had been convoked only five times during the last thirteen years of Matthias Corvinus's rule regained its importance. The first Diet assembled in early 1492. It only ratified the Peace of Pressburg after most noblemen who had attained the first sessions returned home, because they accused the authors of the treaty of treachery for renouncing Matthias's conquests.

Casimir IV died on 7 June 1492 after bequeathing Poland and Lithuania to Vladislaus's younger brothers, John Albert and Alexander, respectively. Vladislaus laid claim to Poland, but the Polish noblemen elected John Albert king on 27 August. Vladislaus had inherited an almost empty treasury from Matthias and he was unable to raise money to finance his predecessor's Black Army (a standing army of mercenaries). The unpaid mercenaries rose up and pillaged several villages along the Sava River. Paul Kinizsi routed them in September. Most mercenaries were executed and Vladislaus dissolved the remnants of the army on 3 January 1493.

The Ottomans began to make regular raids against Hungary along the southern border. An Ottoman army inflicted a crushing defeat on the united army of the leading Croatian barons in the Battle of Krbava Field on 11 September 1493. The Ottomans annexed the Adriatic coast to the north of the river Neretva as far as Omiš. A few months later, the Croatian noblemen assembled at Bihać and tried to seek assistance from Pope Alexander VI and Maximilian of Habsburg.

Nevertheless, Vladislaus was still regarded as the head of a powerful state, especially because he and his two brothers ruled the most powerful states in Central Europe. They met in Lőcse (Levoča in Slovakia) in April 1494 to achieve a common foreign policy, but Vladislaus and John Albert did not reach a compromise about Moldavia and Silesia. Vladislaus levied an extraordinary tax, or "subsidy", without the authorization of the Diet in spring 1494. The noblemen protested against the tax all over the kingdom. Lawrence Újlaki, who was one of the wealthiest barons in Hungary, ordered the murder of a tax-collector and called Vladislaus an ox. Vladislaus accused Újlaki of co-operation with the Ottomans and launched a military campaign against him, compelling him to beg for mercy in early 1495. Újlaki was allowed to retain his most estates. The representatives of Vladislaus and the Ottoman Sultan Bayezid II signed a truce for three years in April 1495, but Ottoman raids across the borders continued in Croatia.

The Estates accused Vladislaus's treasurer, Sigismund Ernuszt, of embezzlement at the Diet in May 1496. At the Diet's demand, Vladislaus ordered the arrest of Ernuszt and his deputy. Ernuszt was released only after paying a ransom of 400,000 gold florins.

Vladislaus visited Bohemia in the first half of 1497. After his return, the Diet persuaded him to forbid the unpopular Tamás Bakócz to use the royal seals, but Bakócz remained the arch-chancellor. The royal seals were entrusted to George Szatmári, who was the Thurzós' close ally. Pope Alexander made Bakócz Archbishop of Esztergom on 20 December.

Ottoman threat
Vladislaus rewarded the Estates of Slavonia (the "shield of Hungary" against the Ottomans) with a separate coat-of-arms at the end of 1497. The truce with the Ottoman Empire came to an end in 1498. The 1498 Diet of Hungary sanctioned the introduction of a one-florin ordinary tax, stipulating that the landowners could retain half of the tax to pay their own retainers. A decree obliged the wealthiest barons and prelates to set up their own armies. Another decree prescribed that the Royal Council could only make decisions if at least eight elected noble jurors of the royal courts attained the meeting. The Diet also passed laws that increased the noblemen's income at the expense of Church revenues and limited the economic privileges of the towns and townspeople.

Vladislaus made an alliance with John Albert and Stephen III of Moldavia against the Ottomans in Kraków on 20 July 1498. He was also reconciled with John Corvinus and made him ban of Croatia, tasking him with the defense of Croatia.

During his reign (1490–1516), the Hungarian royal power declined in favour of the Hungarian magnates, who used their power to curtail the peasants’ freedom. His reign in Hungary was largely stable, although Hungary was under consistent border pressure from the Ottoman Empire and went through the revolt of György Dózsa. On March 11, 1500, the Bohemian Diet adopted a new land constitution that limited royal power, and Vladislav signed it in 1502 (hence it is known as Vladislav land order). Additionally, he oversaw the construction (1493–1502) of the enormous Vladislav Hall atop the palace at the Prague Castle.

Vladislaus died on 13 March 1516, two weeks after his 60th birthday, in the city of Buda. His funeral was held six days later in the main cathedral of the city of Székesfehérvár, where all the Kings of Hungary used to be buried. His son was previously crowned as King of Hungary in 1508 and in 1509 as King of Bohemia before his father died, so the succession was assured. Before he died, Vladislaus called Tamás Bakócz, John Bornemissza, and George Hohenzollern, and named them the bearers and custodians of the young prince Louis. The monarch left a Kingdom in political ruins with a debt of 403,000 Hungarian florins.

Family

Vladislaus II was married three times, the first time in 1476 at Frankfurt/Oder to Barbara of Brandenburg, daughter of Albrecht III Achilles, Elector of Brandenburg, child widow of Silesian Piast Henry XI of Głogów.  His second wife was Beatrice of Naples, the widow of King Matthias, who was a daughter of Ferdinand I of Naples. His third wife, Anne of Foix-Candale, was crowned on 29 September 1502 when she was about 18 years old and he was 46. She gave birth to his only two surviving legitimate children, Anne of Bohemia and Hungary and Louis II of Hungary and Bohemia, and died in 1506 from complications resulting from the birth of Louis.

After his death, Vladislaus' ten-year-old son Louis succeeded him on the thrones of both Bohemia and Hungary. His daughter Anna was married in 1515 to the future emperor Ferdinand of Austria, a grandson of Emperor Maximilian I. Therefore, after the death of Louis at the Battle of Mohács, the succession devolved through Anna to the cadet line of eastern Habsburgs.

Titles
His titles according to the laws in 1492: King of Hungary, Bohemia, Dalmatia, Croatia, Slavonia, Rama, Serbia, Galicia, Lodomeria, Cumania and Bulgaria, Prince of Silesia and Luxembourg, Margrave of Moravia and Upper-/Lower Lusatia.

See also
List of rulers of Bohemia
List of rulers of Hungary

References

Sources

 
 
 
 

 
 
 
 
 
 
 
 
 
 
 
 
 
 
 
 
 
 
 

1456 births
1516 deaths
15th-century monarchs in Europe
16th-century monarchs in Europe
Medieval kings of Bohemia
Burials at the Basilica of the Assumption of the Blessed Virgin Mary
Kings of Croatia
Jagiellonian dynasty
Kings of Hungary
Order of the Dragon
Nobility from Kraków
Polish Prince Royals